The 2012 African Judo Championships were the 33rd edition of the African Judo Championships, and were held in Agadir, Morocco from 4 April to 7 April 2012.

Medal overview

Men

Women

Medals table

References

External links
 

African Championships
African Judo Championships
African Judo Championships
International sports competitions hosted by Morocco
Judo Championships
Sport in Agadir
Judo competitions in Morocco
April 2012 sports events in Africa